Eastern Slavonia, Baranja and Western Syrmia may refer to:

 SAO Eastern Slavonia, Baranja and Western Syrmia (1991–1992)
 Eastern Slavonia, Baranja and Western Syrmia (1995–98)

See also
 United Nations Transitional Administration for Eastern Slavonia, Baranja and Western Sirmium, 1996-1998